Art on the Move is an annual summer arts program held in Detroit, Michigan. 

The organization sponsors temporary art installations during the summer months. These temporary pieces are created by resident artists,  who in turn mentor young artists as the public works are executed and erected. 

Funding for Art on the Move has come from architectural firms in southwestern Michigan, the City of Detroit, and Detroit's Empowerment Zone Development Corporation. 

The program has shifted from its original connection with the Detroit People Mover and now provides programs and exhibits for the Detroit Festival of the Arts.

External links
 Detroit Festival of the Arts
 Detroit Empowerment Zone - link to Art on the Move

Culture of Detroit